Charles Spencer Sutcliffe (7 October 1890 – 1964) was an English footballer who played in the Football League for Rotherham County and Sheffield United. At Sheffield United, Sutcliffe played in the 1925 FA Cup Final, keeping a clean sheet as the Blades won 1–0.

References

1890 births
1964 deaths
English footballers
Association football goalkeepers
Halifax Town A.F.C. players
York City F.C. (1908) players
Leeds City F.C. players
Rotherham County F.C. players
Sheffield United F.C. players
English Football League players
FA Cup Final players